Syllepte monoleuca is a moth in the family Crambidae. It was described by George Hampson in 1912. It is found in Papua New Guinea.

The wingspan is about 28 mm. The forewings are uniform black brown with a cupreous tinge. The hindwings are black brown with a cupreous tinge, with a rather quadrate white spot beyond the lower angle of the cell.

References

Moths described in 1912
monoleuca
Moths of New Guinea